HMS Buffalo was a storeship of the Royal Navy, originally built and launched at Sulkea, opposite Calcutta, in 1813 as the merchant vessel Hindostan. The Admiralty purchased her that year after she arrived in Britain. She later transported convicts and immigrants to Australia, before being wrecked in 1840.

Launch and purchase
Hindostan was built of teak by James Bonner and James Horsburgh, of Firth, in 1813 at Sulkea, on the Hoogly near Calcutta. The Calcutta Gazette, reporting on her launch, described her as a merchantman built to carry grain rice. Her hull was pierced at the upper deck to be able to carry 20 guns, and she measured about 578 tons burthen.

In August 1813, after a six-month maiden voyage, Hindostan arrived in the East India Dock, London to discharge and was offered for sale. She had left Bengal on 18 February, passed the Point de Galle on 13 March, stopped at St Helena on 9 June, and arrived at The Downs on 10 August.

The Lords Commissioners of the Admiralty purchased her on 22 October. David Webster, representing the builders, brokered the sale price of £18,000 for Hindostan. The Navy Board renamed her HMS Buffalo, designated her a sixth rate, and employed her as a storeship.

The Navy Board also purchased the similar Severn (550 tons burthen), that it renamed . Horsburgh had part-financed the building of both Severn and Hindostan in the partnership of Horsburgh & Colman.

Royal Navy service
Buffalo was commissioned in November 1813 under Mr. Richard Anderson, Master, and became a ship of many uses and refits. Anderson was still her master between 1814 and 1815 when she was stationed at the Army Depot at Bermuda. Then in January 1816 Mr. W. Hudson became master.

Buffalo was at Deptford in 1822, 1827, and 1831. She was fitted as a timber carrier to carry spars from New Zealand in 1831. However, she apparently was in the Quarantine Service at Stangate in 1832.

Then in January 1833 she was fitted as a convict ship, and F.W.R. Sadler took command.  Buffalo sailed to Australia 12 May 1833 and arrived on 5 October 1833. She carried 180 female convicts, one of whom died on the journey.

Buffalo was an important ship in the maritime history of South Australia, serving at times as a quarantine, transport or colonisation ship, while also aiding the British expansion into New Zealand, New South Wales, Tasmania, and Upper Canada. Sadler received gifts from the local Maori chief of Tītore in the Bay of Islands during one of HMS Buffalos trips. The gifts included a pin, a club, and an ornate Hei-tiki, all now in the British Museum.

Buffalo was paid-off and recommissioned in January 1835. Then James Wood took command in July 1836. Buffalo sailed from Portsmouth on 23 July 1836, arriving in South Australian waters in December of that year, carrying 176 colonists, including Captain John Hindmarsh, who was to become the first Governor of the new colony of South Australia following the proclamation of that colony on 28 December 1836. Other passengers on HMS Buffalo to South Australia in 1836 included: James Cock, Robert Cock (James father), William Ferguson, Osmond Gilles, Charles Beaumont Howard, Young Bingham Hutchinson, and brothers Giles E. Strangways, Thomas Bewes Strangways and Frank Potts (winemaker).

Only three deaths were ever recorded on Buffalo, a remarkable record considering the medical practices of that period and volumes of passengers she transported.

S. Hindmarsh may have been captain in 1837 but James Wood returned to command and would remain her captain until her loss. Wood sailed Buffalo to Quebec with 300 soldiers as reinforcements for the British forces dealing with the Rebellions of 1837 there.

Charles Morgan Lewis, who had captained the schooner Isabella on her mission to rescue survivors of Charles Eaton from the Torres Strait Islands, is recorded as having travelled as a passenger on Buffalo with the young orphan William D'Oyly, who had survived the wreck and subsequent massacre, back to London from Sydney Cove, departing on 13 May 1838.

On 28 September 1839 she sailed from Quebec with 82 American patriots and 58 French prisoners from Lower Canada who were convicts and part of the Upper Canada Rebellion in 1838. On 12 October a conspiracy to murder the ship's crew was attempted, but was discovered, and the rebels secured. The mutiny was reported in the Morning Chronicle on 22 November, and much later in the Sydney Herald on 22 April 1840. The Americans were transported to Hobart, Tasmania and the French convicts were brought to Sydney, New South Wales.

She was fitted as a timber carrier again in 1839.

Fate
Buffalo was anchored in Mercury Bay off Whitianga and loaded with Kauri spars when a storm on 28 July 1840 wrecked her. The gale parted her from her cables. When it became clear that her crew could not save her, Wood steered her onto the beach. All the crew except two were saved, but she herself was a total loss.

Post-script
The tsunami of 22 May 1960 briefly exposed the wreck as water retreated. People who ran out to see it had to retreat again as the sea level returned to normal.

A team of maritime archaeologists and volunteer divers led by the South Australian Government’s State Heritage Branch located the wreck site in April 1986. The wreck of HMS Buffalo is still visible today at Buffalo Beach off Whitianga. The wreck is only visible from the air at low tide and in clear water conditions.

In 2009 the Deployable Hydrographic Survey Unit of the Royal New Zealand Navy located the wreck using side-scan sonar and dived on the wreck using snorkels.  Much of the wreck has been broken up by storms with the remaining timbers of the hull still in solid condition despite over 150 years in the ocean.

The wreck has been charted by Land Information New Zealand.

Replica

As a tribute, a static replica of Buffalo was built in 1980 on the shore of the Patawalonga River at Glenelg, a suburb of Adelaide, as a restaurant and museum.  It was based on the original Admiralty specifications and plans, with some internal modifications (eg higher clear deck height). After a period of financial difficulties, the venture was closed and the vessel deteriorated.  Despite large-scale redevelopment plans the City of Holdfast Bay announced in January 2019 that the replica would be demolished.

Citations and references
Citations

References

External links
 
 Pioneers and Settlers - Bound for South Australia HMS Buffalo 1836

 

Troop ships of the Royal Navy
Storeships of the Royal Navy
Ships of South Australia
History of immigration to Australia
Convict ships to New South Wales
Shipwrecks of New Zealand
Maritime incidents in July 1840
British ships built in India
1813 ships
Ships of the British East India Company
Age of Sail merchant ships
Merchant ships of the United Kingdom
1840 in New Zealand